Aggressor may refer to:

 Aggressor (And One album), 2003
 Aggressor (Ektomorf album), 2014
 HMS Aggressor, two Royal Navy ships
 USS Aggressor, two US Navy ships
 Aggressor squadron, a US military unit acting as an opponent in wargames
 Aggressor (novel), a 2005 novel by Andy McNab
 Aggressor (horse), a Thoroughbred racehorse
 Aggressor, former name of the Estonian rock band, No-Big-Silence

See also
 Aggression (disambiguation)
 Aggressive (disambiguation)